The aadhiya system, also sometimes spelled as adhiya, is a system, most prevalent in north-eastern, northern Bengali speaking parts of India (as the word is Bengali), where a sex worker is rented a room or apartment by a mashi or brothel keeper, usually an older retired sex worker, who charges the worker rent for the room based on her total earnings rather than at a fixed rate, so that the mashi gets a share of the worker's earnings.

See also
 

 Dance bar
 Pornography in India
 Prostitution in India
 Prostitution in Pakistan 
 Prostitution in colonial India 
 Prostitution in Asia 
 Prostitution by country

Further reading

References

Prostitution in India
Indian words and phrases
Sex workers